David Mobärg (born 17 May 1999) is a Swedish freestyle skier who competed at the 2022 Winter Olympics.

Career
Mobärg represented Sweden at the 2022 Winter Olympics in the ski cross event.

Personal life
Mobärg's brother, Erik Mobärg, is also a freestyle skier.

World Cup results

Season standings

Ski cross individual victories
 4 wins 
 6 podiums

Ski cross mixed team victories
 1 win

World Championship results

Olympic results

References

External links
 

1999 births
Living people
Swedish male freestyle skiers
Snowboarders at the 2016 Winter Youth Olympics
Freestyle skiers at the 2022 Winter Olympics
Olympic freestyle skiers of Sweden
People from Åre Municipality
Sportspeople from Jämtland County
21st-century Swedish people